Pentling is a municipality in the Regensburg district of Bavaria in Germany. It lies on the river Danube.

Pope Emeritus Benedict XVI lived there from 1969 and maintained his house there until his passing on the final day of 2022.

References

Regensburg (district)
Populated places on the Danube